Daniel Kuzemka (born September 23, 1998) is an American soccer player who currently plays for USL Championship side Charleston Battery.

Playing career

Youth and college
Kuzemka attended high school at Centreville High School, where he was the number one ranked goalkeeper in the Mid-Atlantic Region. He also played club soccer for USSDA side Bethesda-Olney.

In 2017, Kuzemka attended Clemson University to play college soccer. In three seasons with the Tigers, Kuzemka made five appearances, missing the 2018 season due to injury. He transferred to the University of North Carolina at Charlotte in 2020, going on to make 23 appearances for the 49ers and was named Conference USA All-Academic Team in his senior year.

Professional
On April 14, 2022, Kuzemka signed with USL Championship side Charleston Battery. He made his professional debut on June 4, 2022, starting in a 3–4 loss to Indy Eleven. He recorded his first professional clean sheet on August 31, 2022, during a 0–0 draw with Pittsburgh Riverhounds. Following the 2022 season, Kuzemka was released by Charleston. He re-signed with the club a few weeks later.

References 

Living people
1998 births
American soccer players
Association football goalkeepers
Charleston Battery players
Charlotte 49ers men's soccer players
Clemson Tigers men's soccer players
People from Clifton, Virginia
Soccer players from Virginia
USL Championship players